Aralihonda is a village in Dharwad district of Karnataka, India.

Population 
The 2011 Census in India reported the population was 841 in 2011.

See also 
List of villages in India

References

Villages in Dharwad district